Below is an incomplete list of those who have served as Vice-Chamberlain to British royal consorts.

Vice-chamberlains to Caroline, Princess of Wales, later Queen Caroline (1714–1737) 
 1727: Sir Andrew Fountaine
 1727–1728: Thomas Smith
 1728–1733: Lord William Beauclerk
 1733–1734: Lord William Hamilton
 1734–1737: Lord Robert Montagu

Vice-chamberlains to Augusta, Princess of Wales (1736–1748) 
 1736–1772: Sir William Irby, 2nd Baronet (Lord Chamberlain 1748–1772, Baron Boston from 1761)

Vice-chamberlains to Queen Charlotte (1761–1818) 
 1761–1766: John West, Viscount Cantelupe
 1766–1768: Hon. Robert Brudenell
 1768–1780: Charles FitzRoy, 1st Baron Southampton
 1780–1782: Vacant
 1782–1792: Hon. Stephen Digby
 1792–1801: William Price
 1801–1818: Col Edward Disbrowe MP

Vice-chamberlains to Queen Adelaide (1830–1837) 
 1830: Hon. Frederick Cathcart
 1830–1837: Hon. William Ashley

Vice-chamberlains to Alexandra, Princess of Wales, later Queen Alexandra (1873–1925) 
 1901–1922: Archibald Acheson, 4th Earl of Gosford

Vice-chamberlains to Mary, Princess of Wales, later Queen Mary (1901–1953) 
 1910–1012: Beilby Lawley, 3rd Baron Wenlock

See also 
 Vice-Chamberlain of the Household

References 

Positions within the British Royal Household
Lists of office-holders in the United Kingdom